Petr Kopfstein (born March 18, 1978) is a Czech aerobatic pilot, representing the Czech Republic in flying aerobatics in an Unlimited category, and most recently a racer in the Master Class category of the Red Bull Air Race. He is the first winner of the Red Bull Air Race Challenger Cup. After his victory of the whole Challenger Cup in 2014, there were rumors about him moving to Masters; it became a reality for the 2016 season. Péter Besenyei and Paul Bonhomme departed from the series.
 
In 2014, Petr Kopfstein won the Czech National Championship in the Unlimited category, beating his mate and aerobatic colleague Martin Šonka. He flew an Extra 300SC.

In 2015, Petr Kopfstein participated again in the Red Bull Air Race Challenger Cup, taking 4th place at the end of the series. All in all, he grabbed 28 points in total, for a three-way tie for 1st place in the point-based ranking.

On 19 January 2016, it was confirmed by the RBAR Management that Petr will move to the main "Masters" category for the 2016 season, together with Peter Podlunsek of Slovenia.

Successes
Red Bull Air Race

Legend: * CAN: Cancelled * DNP: Did not take part * DNS: Did not start * DSQ: Disqualified * SCO: Safety Climb-Out

Flying Aerobatics
2015 - 4th place Red Bull Air Race Challenger Cup, 13th place WAC Châteauroux France, 2nd place Czech National Championships in Unlimited Aerobatics, 1st place in the international competition "Karlovarský pohár" in Unlimited
2014 - 1st place Red Bull Air Race Challenger Cup, 1st place Czech National Championships in Unlimited Aerobatics, 16th place EAC Hungary
2013 - 14th place WAC Texas, USA, 2nd place Czech National Championships in Unlimited Aerobatics
2012 - 1st place in the international competition "Karlovarský pohár" in Advanced, 5th place in one-day aerobatic race Aerobatic Freestyle Challenge, Prague

Gyarary

References

External links

 
 

Aerobatic pilots
Czech aviators
Czech air racers
Red Bull Air Race World Championship pilots
1978 births
Living people
Sportspeople from Karlovy Vary